Chartered Association of Building Engineers (CABE) is a professional body for building engineers in the United Kingdom and overseas.

History 
Chartered Association of Building Engineers was founded as the Incorporated Association of Architects and Surveyors (IAAS) in 1925 in London. The Incorporated Association of Architects and Surveyors became the Association of Building Engineers in 1993 and then the Chartered Association of Building Engineers in 2014, its current name, when it received Royal Charter.

The IAAS was among the bodies which opposed a draft bill which was presented to Parliament in 1927 by the Royal Institute of British Architects' (RIBA) Registration Committee in the course of events which resulted in the passing of the Architects (Registration) Act 1931.

Under the 1931 Act, the Architects' Registration Council of the United Kingdom (ARCUK) was established with the duty of setting up, maintaining and publishing the Register of Architects.  The IAAS was among the bodies named, together with the RIBA, in the First Schedule of the Act as being entitled to appoint one member in respect of every five hundred of their own members.

The Register of Architects is now maintained and published under the Architects Act 1997, which reconstituted ARCUK.  In consequence, the IAAS was no longer an appointing body, nor any of the other bodies named in the 1931 Act, which has been repealed.

In 2020, Chartered Association of Building Engineers opened a second office in Hong Kong, chaired by Kyran Sze.

CABE is registered with the Engineering Council and its members may apply for registration as CEng, IEng, and EngTech. CABE also holds a license to award registration with Society of the Environment; CABE members may apply for registration as CENv, REnvP, or REnvTech.

Structure 
CABE is a membership organisation and is governed by a board of directors that sets the objectives of the organisation – the executive team deliver these objectives. Entry to membership of CABE is via several routes and members must undertake continuing professional development throughout the lifetime of their membership of the association in order to maintain their professional standards.

CABE has several designations for members, these are:

 Chartered Fellow (post-nominal "FCABE") is the highest level of CABE membership and reflects the knowledge, expertise, and experience of the industry's most experienced professionals and a commitment to furthering the profession of building engineering.
 Chartered Building Engineers (post-nominal "MCABE Chartered Building Engineer" sometimes seen as "C.Build E MCABE") have a clear commitment to high ethical standards, professionalism, and technical competence recognised by the award of the additional title of Chartered Building Engineer, which is a regulated title under the Association's Royal Charter.
 Chartered Members (post-nominal"MCABE") demonstrate a clear commitment to high ethical standards, to cross sector collaboration, and to continuous professional development.
 Graduate Members (post-nominal "Grad CABE") focus on converting the theoretical knowledge gained as a student into practical experience.
 Associate Members (post-nominal "ACABE") demonstrates a member's level of expertise and professional competence. Considered to be one of the preparatory routes to full chartered memberships.
 Technician Members (post-nominal "Tech CABE") a sign of professional commitment to working towards the highest level of competency at the start of a career.
 Student Membership is free and available to part and full-time students studying in a field relevant to the built environment and shows enthusiasm and commitment to a career within the industry.

In addition the membership grades for individuals, CABE Company Partners and CABE Academic Partners work with CABE to implement change in each respective area of the industry.

Impact 
In 2023 CABE introduced its Built Environment Series, an events programme consisting of four major regional events taking place in England, Ireland, Scotland, and Wales.  This series culminates with the Built Environment Live Event, where CABE will have a significant presence at a large trade event in December. The Built Environment Awards will be held following this trade event.

CABE holds a smaller scale of conference called "buildeng" regularly throughout the year and is attended based on region. The "buildeng" conferences offer continual professional development opportunities. It also provides accreditation for academic courses which confirms that academic programmes are aligned with a competency framework and that the academic partners meet high standards of education, welfare, and good practice.

Regions
CABE has regions in the United Kingdom and Ireland each with elected Chairman, Secretary, Treasurer and Committee, these are:

 Eastern
 East Midlands
 Northern
 Northern Ireland
 North West
 Republic of Ireland
 Scotland
 Southern
 South West
 Wales
 West Midlands
 Yorkshire & Humber

In addition, CABE operates in the following countries:

 Australia
 Malaysia
 Hong Kong
 Singapore
 Middle East
 Macau
 USA
 China

Arms

See also
 Architectural engineering
 Architects' Registration Council of the United Kingdom
 Architects Registration Board
 Architectural technologist
 Building engineer
 Faculty of Architects and Surveyors
 Society of Architects (1884-1925)
 Society of Professional Engineers UK
 Reform of Architects Registration

References

External links

 

Registration of architects in the United Kingdom
Architecture organisations based in the United Kingdom
Organizations established in 1925
Building engineering organizations
1925 establishments in the United Kingdom
Organisations based in Northamptonshire
Engineering societies based in the United Kingdom
Professional associations based in the United Kingdom
ECUK Licensed Members